Dagupan Bus Co., Inc. or simply known as Dagupan Bus was a provincial bus company based in  Dagupan, Pangasinan. This company was a sister company of Saulog Transit up until the company's management was transferred to JAC Liner Inc., and Genesis Transport (as North Genesis) following Dagupan Bus' soldout in 2015.

History
Dagupan Bus Co., Inc. started its operation in 1974 when they acquired the franchise of Villarey Transit, also a provincial bus company with only six Mitsubishi Fuso buses, through Saulog Transit Inc. to be able to expand its operation to Northern Luzon. They used an old livery of dirty white with maroon, red, and green stripes. Later, it has adopted the use of dirty white livery and red stripes during its re-fleeting of units in 2007.

Issues and Controversies
The Quezon City Regional Trial Court issued the writ of preliminary injunction against the Saulog group of companies who attempted to sell their stocks to other bus companies.

Another controversy regarding Saulog Transit Inc. and Dagupan Bus Co., Inc. was a conflict which sparked between the Saulog stakeholders after the assassinations of their ancestors. Eliseo Saulog, the founder of Saulog Transit Inc. and father of the Saulog children, Ignacio Saulog, Luciano Saulog, Teodoro Saulog, Virginia Saulog, Dr. Melquiades Saulog, Maura Saulog-Aguinaldo, Lilia Saulog-Venturina, and Dr. Marietta Saulog-Vergara, was shot and killed in 1960 by an unidentified gunman, while the family patriarch, Ruben Saulog, father of the current chief executive and one of the eight children of the founder, was also assassinated in 1990. Until then, the case of such killings were still uncertain and unresolved. The attempts to sell the two companies were assured by the lawyer Bernard Saulog, who got 75% of the total ₱1.4 B assets, while the remaining 25% were given to the rest of the clan members. Unfortunately, Teodoro Saulog and his clan members refused to give up Saulog Transit Inc. and Dagupan Bus Co., Inc.

In 2014, Dagupan Bus Co., Inc together with Mt. Province Cable Tours sold their franchises to G.V. Florida Transport for their routes in Baguio to areas within Benguet and Mountain Province. It underwent a "private transaction" between the said companies, and the franchise rights were failed to be transferred from Dagupan Bus and Mt. Province Cable Tours to G.V. Florida. The said "private transaction" was not honored by the Land Transportation Franchising and Regulatory Board (LTFRB), and was never known of, until February 2013, where one of their units fell into a ravine, killing 15 of its passengers. It resulted to them being suspended for 30 days and paying for damages.

Soldout to JAC Liner and Genesis Transport

It was in 2010 when Saulog Transit Inc. and Genesis Transport Service Inc. signed a memorandum of agreement for the long time cooperation and allocation of the franchise of the former. Genesis Transport answered all of the assets of Saulog Transit when it was found out that the Saulog clan was unable to shoulder all of the annual employees' contributions to Social Security System, Home Development Mutual Fund (Pag-Ibig) and PhilHealth. Hence, Saulog Transit and Dagupan Bus Co., Inc. acquired new bus units.

In 2011, Dagupan Bus Co. has given up the routes going to Cagayan Valley, which they transferred to GV Florida Transport, using ordinary buses manufactured by Del Monte Motor Works, Inc. as part of the signed agreement by Saulog Transit Inc. and Genesis Transport Services Inc.

In 2015, JAC Liner Inc. and Genesis Transport took over the management of Dagupan Bus. The Pangasinan routes of Dagupan Bus were acquired by JAC Liner but retaining the "Dagupan Bus" name, while Genesis Transport took over their Baguio route under the name North Genesis.

Fleet

After their sold-out in 2015, Dagupan Bus has these units:

Yutong ZK6122HD9
Yutong ZK6119H2
Yutong ZK6119HA
Yutong ZK6107HA
DMMC DM 12 Hino RM2PSS
Daewoo BV115 (Airconditioned unit)
Daewoo BS106 (Airconditioned unit)
Daewoo BH117H (Airconditioned unit)
Golden Dragon XML6103
Golden Dragon XML6127

Before their sold-out in 2015, Dagupan Bus used to have these units:

Hino RK1JST
Hino RF821
Santarosa NV Nissan Diesel (Ordinary Fare unit)
Nissan Diesel Euro RB46S

Terminals
These are the combined terminals of Dagupan Bus under JAC Liner Genesis Transport and Solid North.

Metro Manila
EDSA Cubao cor. New York St., Quezon City 
Solid North Terminal, EDSA Cubao, Pinagkaisahan, Quezon City

Provincial
Poblacion East, Agno, Pangasinan
Quezon Avenue, Alaminos, Pangasinan
Luciente 1.0, Bolinao, Pangasinan
Perez Boulevard, Dagupan
Governor Pack Road, Baguio

Destinations

Under JAC Liner
With the management under JAC Liner Inc., Dagupan Bus uses the terminals and facilities of JAC Liner, including their main terminal in Cubao.

Metro Manila
Cubao, Quezon City
Araneta City Bus Port
Provincial Destinations
Mabalacat City, Pampanga (Dau Bus Terminal)
Tarlac City, Tarlac
Agno, Pangasinan
Alaminos, Pangasinan
Bolinao, Pangasinan
Dagupan via Manaoag, Pangasinan
Lingayen, Pangasinan
Manaoag, Pangasinan
Inter-Provincial Routes
Dagupan - Baguio
Dagupan - Sta. Cruz, Zambales

Under Genesis Transport (North Genesis)
Under the management of Genesis Transport, Dagupan Bus, under the name North Genesis uses the former terminal of Dagupan Bus in Cubao. They also share terminals and facilities of Genesis Transport.

Metro Manila
Cubao, Quezon City
Provincial Destinations
Baguio via Tarlac/TPLEX
Mabalacat City, Pampanga (Dau Bus Terminal)
Concepcion, Tarlac via SCTEX
Tarlac City, Tarlac
Gerona, Tarlac
Paniqui, Tarlac
Carmen, Pangasinan
Urdaneta City, Pangasinan

Former Destinations
Dagupan Bus used to serve the San Carlos, Pangasinan route. The said route is now operated under JAC Liner's Pangasinan Solid North Transit, Inc.

Dagupan Bus had also routes along Cagayan, Isabela and Quirino provinces, In 2011, GV Florida Transport took over the Cagayan Valley routes of Dagupan Bus, using ordinary fare buses manufactured by Del Monte Motors, but these were terminated after the GV Florida incident in 2014.

Solano, Nueva Vizcaya
Ilagan City, Isabela
Roxas, Isabela
Santiago City, Isabela
Maddela, Quirino
Piat, Cagayan
Tuao, Cagayan
Tuguegarao City, Cagayan

Aside from JAC Liner's takeover of the Dagupan Bus any Co's management, they also had services along Anda, Pangasinan (which has been inactive since 2015), as well as in San Fabian, San Quintin, San Nicolas and Natividad.

And also, they once had services along Pasay.

See also
Fermina Express
Five Star Bus Company
Genesis Transport Service, Inc.
JAC Liner Inc.
Lucena Lines Inc.
Dionisio R. De Leon Express
Saulog Transit Inc.
List of bus companies of the Philippines

References

Bus companies of the Philippines
Transportation in Pangasinan
Transport companies established in 1974
Philippine companies established in 1974